Maputaland is a natural region of Southern Africa. It is located in the northern part of the province of KwaZulu-Natal, South Africa between Eswatini and the coast. In a wider sense it may also include the southernmost region of Mozambique. The bird routes and coral reefs off the coast are major tourist attractions.

Now the name of this traditional region is being revived for the Maputaland-Pondoland bushland and thickets, one of the ecoregions of South Africa, as well as for the Maputaland-Pondoland-Albany Hotspot.

Geography
Maputaland is bordered by the Ubombo Mountains in the west and the Indian Ocean in the east. It covers an area of about 10,000 km2, stretching approximately from the town of Hluhluwe and the northern section of Lake St. Lucia to the border of Mozambique and South Africa, or beyond to Maputo in Mozambique.

Tongaland
The South African section of Maputaland was also previously known as Tongaland after the Tonga people who live there. The usually flat region feeds the Phongolo and Mkhuze River. 
On 11 June 1895, Tongaland was annexed by Great Britain. 

'Tongaland', the name of the traditional region of the Tsonga, has now largely fallen into disuse. It is still occasionally found in scientific works though, as well as in the naming of species, such as the Tongaland cannibal snail (Natalina wesseliana).

See also

References

Bibliography
 Elephant Coast Visitor Guide, (2007/8).
 Pooley, E. (1993). The Complete Field Guide to Trees of Natal, Zululand and Transkei.

External links
Maputaland-Pondoland bushland and thickets

Regions of Africa
Natural regions of South Africa
Geography of KwaZulu-Natal
Geography of Mozambique